Bricks Are Heavy is the third studio album by American rock band L7, released on April 14, 1992 by Slash Records. The album peaked at number 160 on the US Billboard 200 and number one on the Heatseekers Albums chart. As of June 2000, Bricks Are Heavy has sold 327,000 copies in the United States, according to Nielsen Soundscan.

Production
Produced by the band and Butch Vig, musically the album is heavier and dirtier than the band's previous recordings and described as "catchy tunes and mean vocals on top of ugly guitars and a quick-but-thick bottom of cast-iron grunge" by Entertainment Weekly.

Critical reception

In a contemporary review for Playboy, Robert Christgau regarded Bricks Are Heavy as an "object lesson in how to advance your music by meeting the marketplace halfway", though he believed it would not sell as much as it deserved. He said Vig helped L7 produce grunge-metal featuring "intense admixtures of ditty and power chord" that "never quite gathers Nirvana's momentum, but it's just as catchy and a touch nastier." Greg Kot was less enthusiastic in the Chicago Tribune, writing that there were not many good songs such as "Slide" and "the performances-while certainly ferocious-aren't sufficiently varied enough to make up the difference."

NME listed it as the 39th best album of 1992. It was ranked at number 4 on The Village Voices "Pazz & Jop: Dean's List", as well as number 32 on their "Pazz & Jop: Critics Poll". In 2015, Spin placed it at number 249 on the "300 Best Albums of the Past 30 Years (1985-2014)" list.

Track listing

Personnel
Credits adapted from liner notes.

L7
 Donita Sparks – guitar, lead vocals (on tracks 1, 2, 3, 4, 8 and 10)
 Suzi Gardner – guitar, lead vocals (on tracks 6, 9 and 11)
 Jennifer Finch – bass, lead vocals (on tracks 5 and 7)
 Demetra Plakas – drums, backing vocals (on track 3)

Additional musician
 Paul Ryan – bongos

Production
 Butch Vig – production, engineering, mixing
 Howie Weinberg – mastering
 Steve Marker – engineering
 Mr. Colson – engineering
 Elizabeth Hale – art direction
 Jeff Price – art direction
 Randall Martin – artwork
 Vicki Berndt – photography
 Arlan E. Helm – photography
 Damion Romero – photography

Charts

Album

Singles

References

External links
 

1992 albums
L7 (band) albums
Albums produced by Butch Vig
Slash Records albums
Albums recorded at Sound City Studios